Booyah (also spelled booya, bouja, boulyaw, or bouyou) is a thick stew, believed to have originated in Belgium, and made throughout the Upper Midwestern United States. Booyah can require up to two days and multiple cooks to prepare; it is cooked in specially designed "booyah kettles" and usually meant to serve hundreds or even thousands of people. The name can also refer to a social event surrounding the meal.

Description

In cooking booyah, one makes a base or broth derived from meat bones, to which vegetables are added. Beef, chicken, and pork are popular varieties of meat for booyah (with all three often in the same kettle), with vegetables such as carrots, peas, onion, and potatoes also in the mix. A wide variety of seasonings are used, sometimes lowered into the kettle in a cheesecloth bag.

Etymology
The term "booyah" may be a variant of "bouillon". It is thought to have derived from the Walloon language words for "boil" (bouillir) and "broth" (bouillon). The spelling with an H has been attributed to phonetic spelling by Wallonian immigrants from Belgium. The Dictionary of American Regional English attributes the term to French Canadian immigrants; others attribute it to a derivation from the Provençal seafood dish bouillabaisse.

An article in the Green Bay Press-Gazette on October 29, 1976, speculating on the origin of the spelling and related fundraiser event, reads:

A November 19, 2015, Press-Gazette article repeats Rentmeester's claim but also suggests that the dish "could have erupted as a tradition in multiple places at once". The article notes that there are several variations on the name "booyah" around the Upper Midwest that "appear to be attempts to phonetically manage the hard-to-spell word 'bouillon', and they all are pronounced roughly the same".

Modern day
Booyah is still made in northern and northeastern Wisconsin,  Minnesota, and Michigan's Upper Peninsula at county fairs, VFW gatherings, at booyah cooking contests, and in smaller amounts at private gatherings. In a 2018 article in the Post Crescent, Booyah was reportedly sold at church and other non-profit fundraisers for $20 (U.S. dollar) per gallon (4 liters). The Green Bay Booyah baseball team was named after the stew.

See also

 Burgoo
 List of stews
 List of soups

References

External links
 Authentic Chicken Booyah recipe from Mona Faye's Kitchen
 Green Bay recipe derivation
 Rieder's Polish Bouja
 A whole lotta Bouja
 What is Booya?

American stews
Cuisine of the Midwestern United States
Cuisine of Wisconsin
Cuisine of Minnesota
French-Canadian culture in the United States
Culture of Saint Paul, Minnesota
Culture of Green Bay, Wisconsin
American meat dishes